Methylammonium lead halides (MALHs) are solid compounds with perovskite structure and a chemical formula of CH3NH3PbX3, where X = I, Br or Cl. They have potential applications in solar cells, lasers, light-emitting diodes, photodetectors, radiation detectors, scintillator, magneto-optical data storage and hydrogen production.

Properties and synthesis
The first MALHs to be synthesized were the methylammonium derivatives CH3NH3SnX3 and CH3NH3PbX3. Their potential in the area of energy conversion wasn't realized until decades later.
In the CH3NH3PbX3 cubic crystal structure the methylammonium cation (CH3NH3+) is surrounded by PbX6 octahedra. The X ions are not fixed and can migrate through the crystal with an activation energy of 0.6 eV; the migration is vacancy assisted. The methylammonium cations can rotate within their cages. At room temperature the ions have the CN axis aligned towards the face directions of the unit cells and the molecules randomly change to another of the six face directions on a 3 ps time scale.

The solubility of MALHs strongly decreases with increased temperature: from 0.8 g/mL at 20 °C to 0.3 g/mL at 80 °C for CH3NH3PbBr3 in dimethylformamide. This property is used in the growth of MALH single crystals and films from solution, using a mixture of CH3NH3X and PbX2 powders as the precursor. The growth rates are 3–20 mm3/hour for CH3NH3PbI3 and reach 38 mm3/hour for CH3NH3PbBr3 crystals.

The resulting crystals are metastable and dissolve in the growth solution when cooled to room temperature. They have bandgaps of 2.18 eV for CH3NH3PbBr3 and 1.51 eV for CH3NH3PbI3, while their respective carrier mobilities are 24 and 67 cm2/(V·s). Their thermal conductivity is exceptionally low, ~0.5 W/(K·m) at room temperature for CH3NH3PbI3.

Thermal decomposition of CH3NH3PbI3 gives methyl iodide (CH3I) and ammonia (NH3).

{CH3NH3PbI3(s)}  ->[\Delta] {PbI2(s)} + {CH3I(g)} + {NH3(g)}

Applications
MALHs have potential applications in solar cells, lasers, light-emitting diodes, photodetectors, radiation detectors, scintillator and hydrogen production. The power conversion efficiency of MALH solar cells exceeds 19%.

Historic references

*

See also
Perovskite solar cell
Methylammonium halide

References

Lead(II) compounds
Perovskites
Articles containing video clips
Methylammonium compounds